Frequency bands for 5G New Radio (5G NR), which is the air interface or radio access technology of the 5G mobile networks, are separated into two different frequency ranges. First there is Frequency Range 1 (FR1), which includes sub-6 GHz frequency bands, some of which are traditionally used by previous standards, but has been extended to cover potential new spectrum offerings from 410 MHz to 7125 MHz. The other is Frequency Range 2 (FR2), which includes frequency bands from 24.25 GHz to 71.0 GHz. Frequency bands are also available for non-terrestrial networks in the sub-6 GHz range.

Frequency bands 

From the latest published version (Rel. 18) of the respective 3GPP technical standard (TS 38.101), the following tables list the specified frequency bands and the channel bandwidths of the 5G NR standard.

Note that the NR bands are defined with prefix of "n". When the NR band is overlapping with the 4G LTE band, they share the same band number.

Frequency Range 1

Frequency Range 2

Non-terrestrial Frequency Range

See also 

 5G
 5G NR
 List of 5G NR networks
 LTE frequency bands
 UMTS frequency bands
 GSM frequency bands
 Cellular frequencies

References

External links 

 Wireless frequency bands and telecom protocols reference and tools

5G (telecommunication)
Bandplans